Heinrich Friedrich Ludwig Rellstab (13 April 179927 November 1860) was a German poet and music critic. He was born and died in Berlin. He was the son of the music publisher and composer Johann Carl Friedrich Rellstab. An able pianist, he published articles in various periodicals, including the influential liberal Vossische Zeitung, and launched the music journal Iris im Gebiete der Tonkunst, which was published in Berlin from 1830 to 1841. His outspoken criticism of the influence in Berlin of Gaspare Spontini landed him in jail in 1837.

Rellstab had considerable influence as a music critic and, because of this, had some power over what music could be used for German nationalistic purposes in the mid-nineteenth century. Because he had "an effective monopoly on music criticism" in Frankfurt and due to the popularity of his writings, Rellstab's approval would have been important for any musician's career in areas in which German nationalism was present.

The first seven songs of Franz Schubert's Schwanengesang have words by Rellstab, who had left them in 1825 with Beethoven, whose assistant Anton Schindler passed them on to Schubert. His work was also set to music by Franz Liszt.

He is also known to have given Beethoven's Piano Sonata No. 14 in C-sharp minor, Op. 27/2, its famous nickname Moonlight Sonata.

References

1799 births
1860 deaths
German poets
German music critics
Musicians from Berlin
People from the Margraviate of Brandenburg
German male poets
19th-century poets
19th-century German musicians
19th-century German writers
19th-century German male writers
German male non-fiction writers